Aaron Cook Jr. (born December 28, 1997) is an American basketball player. He had played for the Southern Illinois Salukis, Gonzaga Bulldogs, and Georgia Bulldogs.

High school career
Cook grew up in St. Louis, Missouri, and attended Westminster Christian Academy in nearby Town and Country. As a junior, he averaged over 16 points per game and led his team to a 24–6 record and a district championship. In his senior year, he finished with the sixth-highest scoring average in St. Louis with 22.1 points per game. He helped his team finish 24–6 and was named First Team All-Metro by the St. Louis Post-Dispatch. Cook was not heavily recruited out of high school. On October 2, 2015, he verbally committed to play college basketball at Southern Illinois over offers from Liberty, South Dakota State, Ohio, Eastern Illinois, Central Michigan, and Jacksonville State.

College career

Southern Illinois
Coming into his freshman season, Cook missed some time with a torn labrum. As a freshman, Cook played in 32 of SIU's 33 games, playing backup point guard and averaged 3.0 points and 0.9 assists in 10.6 minutes of play. On January 24, 2018, Cook scored a career-high 25 points in an 82–77 win versus Indiana State. On February 14, he sank the game-winning free throws with 4.1 seconds remaining in an 81–80 overtime win against Missouri State. As a sophomore, Cook averaged 9.8 points and 2.7 assists per game. Cook started 32 of 33 games, led the team in 3-point shooting percentage at 38.4 percent, tied Marcus Bartley for the team lead with 90 assists, and finished with 47 steals. He was named to the MVC Most-Improved Team as well as the MVC All-Academic Second-Team. Cook scored a junior season-high 23 points on December 8, in an 83–73 victory over Southeast Missouri State. In his junior year, Cook started every game, averaging 10.5 points and 3.7 assists per game, and was named to the MVC Scholar-Athlete Second Team. As a senior, Cook played in just six games before breaking his right hand in a loss to Murray State. Despite initially being ruled out for four to six weeks, Cook took a medical redshirt and missed the remainder of the season. Cook was leading the Salukis in scoring (15.0 points per game) and assists (3.3 per game) before he was sidelined with the injury, and he was named to the Sunshine Slam All-Tournament team.

Gonzaga
On April 7, 2020, Cook announced that he was transferring to Gonzaga for his redshirt senior season. He chose the Bulldogs over offers from DePaul, Arkansas and Santa Clara. Cook averaged 4.2 points, 1.7 assists and 1.6 rebounds per game.

Georgia
On May 24, 2021, Cook announced he was transferring to Georgia, taking advantage on an additional season of eligibility granted by the NCAA due to the COVID-19 pandemic. On November 16, he scored 22 points in a 76–60 victory over South Carolina State and surpassed the 1,000-point threshold.

Career statistics

College

|-
| style="text-align:left;"| 2016–17
| style="text-align:left;"| Southern Illinois
| 32 || 0 || 10.6 || .333 || .185 || .776 || .8 || .9 || 1.0 || .3 || 3.0
|-
| style="text-align:left;"| 2017–18
| style="text-align:left;"| Southern Illinois
| 33 || 32 || 30.0 || .439 || .384 || .696 || 2.3 || 2.7 || 1.4 || .3 || 9.8
|-
| style="text-align:left;"| 2018–19
| style="text-align:left;"| Southern Illinois
| 32 || 32 || 32.8 || .396 || .348 || .651 || 2.4 || 3.7 || 1.3 || .3 || 10.5
|-
| style="text-align:left;"| 2019–20
| style="text-align:left;"| Southern Illinois
| 6 || 6 || 31.2 || .552 || .273 || .591 || 3.0 || 3.3 || 3.2 || .2 || 15.0
|-
| style="text-align:left;"| 2020–21
| style="text-align:left;"| Gonzaga
| 30 || 1 || 13.4 || .500 || .350 || .657 || 1.6 || 1.7 || .9 || .1 || 4.2
|-
| style="text-align:left;"| 2021–22
| style="text-align:left;"| Georgia
| 31 || 31 || 32.2 || .381 || .282 || .705 || 2.7 || 5.4 || 1.4 || .2 || 10.5
|- class="sortbottom"
| style="text-align:center;" colspan="2"| Career
| 164 || 102 || 24.2 || .415 || .326 || .686 || 2.0 || 2.9 || 1.4 || .2 || 7.9

Personal life
Cook is the son of Aaron Cook Sr. and Regina Cook. His father was a star basketball player at Jennings High in suburban St. Louis and is in that school's athletic hall of fame. From there, his father matriculated to what is now known as Harris-Stowe State University, where he was a four-year starter for the Hornets in the NAIA (small-college classification). Aaron Cook Jr's grandfather, Jimmie Cook, was an immensely successful high school coach in St. Louis, leading the McKinley High Goldbugs to the 1982 Missouri Class 2A boys state basketball title.

See also
 List of NCAA Division I men's basketball career games played leaders

References

External links
Georgia Bulldogs bio
Gonzaga Bulldogs bio
Southern Illinois Salukis bio

1997 births
Living people
American men's basketball players
Basketball players from St. Louis
Georgia Bulldogs basketball players
Gonzaga Bulldogs men's basketball players
Point guards
Southern Illinois Salukis men's basketball players